Väinämöinen was a Finnish coastal defence ship, the sister ship of the Finnish Navy's flagship  and also the first ship of her class. She was built at the Crichton-Vulcan shipyard in Turku and was launched in 1932. Following the end of the Continuation War, Väinämöinen was handed over to the Soviet Union as war reparations and renamed Vyborg. The ship remained in Soviet hands until her scrapping in 1966.

Design
Väinämöinen and Ilmarinen were planned to be mobile coastal fortresses for the defence of the Finnish demilitarized islands at Åland in particular. The two ships were not well suited for the open seas due to a design with emphasis on operations in the shallow waters of the archipelago: it has been said that they were volatile and rolled too much. The minimal depth keel, together with the high conning tower, made the ships' movements slow and wide. It was said that the ships were uncomfortable, but harmless to their crews.

Fire control
In fire control, the two coastal ships were identical. The fire control centre and the gun turrets were connected electrically so that ranging and orders could be given without spoken contact. With the aid of mechanical calculators, the values were transferred directly to the gun turrets.

Operational history

Winter War
During the Winter War, the two coastal defence ships were transferred to the Åland islands to protect against invasion. When the ice cover started to become too thick in December, the ships were transferred to Turku, where their anti-aircraft artillery aided in the defence of the city.

Continuation War
The only time Väinämöinen and Ilmarinen fired their heavy artillery against an enemy was at the beginning of the Continuation War, during the Soviet Red Army evacuation of their base at the Hanko Peninsula. Väinämöinen also participated in the distraction manoeuvre Operation Nordwind on 13 September 1941, during the course of which her sister ship Ilmarinen was lost to mines.

In 1943 "Detachment Väinämöinen", which consisted of Väinämöinen, six VMV patrol boats and six motor minesweepers, was moved east to take positions along the coast between Helsinki and Kotka. She did not actively participate in many operations, since the heavier Soviet naval units never left Leningrad, where they were used as floating batteries during the siege. As a result, Väinämöinens primary operational duties were to patrol the Gulf of Finland between the minefields "Seeigel" and "Nashorn", as well as protection of the German-Finnish anti-submarine net across the gulf.

During the Soviet assault in the summer of 1944, the Soviets put much effort into trying to find and sink Väinämöinen. Reconnaissance efforts revealed a large warship anchored in Kotka harbour and the Soviets launched an air attack of 132 bombers and fighters. However the target was not Väinämöinen — instead it was the German anti-aircraft cruiser Niobe, which was sunk during this attack.

Postwar
After the end of the Continuation War Väinämöinen was handed over as war reparations to the Soviet Union. The ship was handed over on 29 May 1947 to the Soviet Baltic Fleet, where she was renamed Vyborg. The ship served over 6 years in the Red Fleet at the Soviet base in Porkkala, Finland. The ship was called Vanya (a Russian short form of the name Ivan) by the sailors of the Baltic Fleet.

Vyborg was modernized during the 1950s and served for a while as an accommodation ship in Tallinn. Preparations to scrap the ship were begun in 1958. During this time, there were talks to return the ship to Finland. The ship was, however, scrapped in 1966 at a Leningrad scrapyard. According to Soviet calculations, 2,700 tons of metal were recovered.

Notes

Bibliography

External links

  Finnish “Lighthouse Battleships” at Dieselpunk.org
  Finnish Navy in World War II: Coast Defense ships
 Coastal Defence Ship Väinämöinen at World War II Database

Ships of the Finnish Navy
Ships built in Turku
World War II naval ships of Finland
1932 ships
Ships of the Soviet Navy
Finland–Soviet Union relations
World War II coastal defence ships